The American Football League (AFL) All-Time Team was selected on January 14, 1970. The first and second teams were determined by a panel of members of the AFL's Hall of Fame Board of Selectors:

Offense

Defense

Special teams

Coach

See also
 List of American Football League players

Notes

References